Pythonichthys sanguineus is an eel in the family Heterenchelyidae (mud eels). It was described by Felipe Poey in 1868. It is a tropical, marine eel which is known from Cuba, Puerto Rico, and Suriname, in the western central Atlantic Ocean. It leads a benthic lifestyle, dwelling in reefs or rocky regions at a maximum depth of 37 metres. Males can reach a maximum total length of 41.9 centimetres.

References

Heterenchelyidae
Fish described in 1868